Tachininae is a subfamily of flies in the family Tachinidae.

Tribes & genera
Tribe Ernestiini
Appendicia Stein, 1924
Cleonice Robineau-Desvoidy, 1863
Eloceria Robineau-Desvoidy, 1863
Ernestia Robineau-Desvoidy, 1830
Eurithia Robineau-Desvoidy, 1844
Fausta Robineau-Desvoidy, 1830
Gymnocheta Robineau-Desvoidy, 1830
Hyalurgus Brauer & Bergenstamm, 1893
Loewia Egger, 1856
Zophomyia Macquart, 1835
Tribe Graphogastrini
Graphogaster Rondani, 1868
Phytomyptera Rondani, 1845
Tribe Leskiini
Aphria Robineau-Desvoidy, 1830
Bithia Robineau-Desvoidy, 1863
Demoticus Macquart, 1854
Leskia Robineau-Desvoidy, 1830
Solieria Robineau-Desvoidy, 1848
Tribe Linnaemyini
Chrysosomopsis Townsend, 1916
Linnaemya Robineau-Desvoidy, 1830
Lydina Robineau-Desvoidy, 1830
Lypha Robineau-Desvoidy, 1830
Tribe Macquartiini
Anthomyiopsis Townsend, 1916
Macquartia Robineau-Desvoidy, 1830
Tribe Microphthalmini
Dexiosoma Rondani, 1856
Tribe Minthoini
Mintho Robineau-Desvoidy, 1830
Tribe Myiotrixini
Myiotrixa Brauer & Bergenstamm, 1893
Obscuromyia Barraclough & O'Hara, 1998
Tribe Neaerini
Neaera Robineau-Desvoidy, 1830
Tribe Nemoraeini
Nemoraea Robineau-Desvoidy, 1830
Tribe Pelatachinini
Pelatachina Meade, 1894
Tribe Siphonini
Actia Robineau-Desvoidy, 1830
Aphantorhaphopsis Townsend, 1926
Ceranthia Robineau-Desvoidy, 1830
Ceromya Robineau-Desvoidy, 1830
Entomophaga Lioy, 1864
Goniocera Brauer & Bergenstamm, 1891
Peribaea Robineau-Desvoidy, 1863
Proceromyia Mensil, 1957
Siphona Meigen, 1803
Tribe Tachinini
Adejeania Townsend, 1913
Archytas Jaennicke, 1867
Chrysomikia Mesnil, 1970
Cnephaotachina Brauer & von Bergenstamm, 1894
Copecrypta Townsend, 1908
Deopalpus Townsend, 1908
Epalpus Rondani, 1850
Germaria Robineau-Desvoidy, 1830
Hystriomyia Portschinsky, 1881
Jurinella Brauer & von Bergenstamm, 1889
Jurinia Robineau-Desvoidy, 1830
Juriniopsis Townsend, 1916
Laufferiella Villeneuve, 1929
Mesnilisca Zimin, 1974
Mikia Kowarz, 1885
Nowickia Wachtl, 1894
Paradejeania Brauer & von Bergenstamm, 1893
Pararchytas Brauer & von Bergenstamm, 1895
Parepalpus Coquillett, 1902
Peleteria Robineau-Desvoidy, 1830
Protodejeania Townsend, 1915
Rhachoepalpus Townsend, 1908
Sarromyia Pokorny, 1893
Schineria Rondani, 1865
Tachina Meigen, 1803
Xanthoepalpus Townsend, 1914
Tribe Triarthriini
Triarthria Stephens, 1829
Cucuba Richter, 2008

References

 
Diptera of Asia
Diptera of Europe
Diptera of North America
Brachycera subfamilies